"Behind Blue Eyes" is a song by English rock band the Who. It is the second single from the band's fifth album, Who's Next (1971), and was originally written by Pete Townshend for his Lifehouse project. The song is one of the Who's best-known recordings and has been covered by many artists, including Limp Bizkit.

Background
"Behind Blue Eyes" originated after a Who concert in Denver on 9 June 1970. Following the performance, Townshend became tempted by a female groupie, but he instead went back to his room alone, possibly as a result of the teachings of his spiritual leader, Meher Baba. Upon reaching his room, he began writing a prayer, the first words being "When my fist clenches, crack it open..." These words later appeared as lyrics in the "climactic rocking section" of "Behind Blue Eyes."

When "Behind Blue Eyes" was to be released as part of the aborted Lifehouse project, the song was sung from the point of view of the main villain, Jumbo. The lyrics are a first-person lament from Jumbo, who is always angry and full of angst because of all the pressure and temptation that surrounds him, and the song was intended to be his "theme song" had the project been successful. Pete Townshend said of the song's lyrics:

The version of "Behind Blue Eyes" released on Who's Next in 1971 was the second version the band recorded; the first was recorded at the Record Plant in New York on 18 March 1971 and features Al Kooper on Hammond organ. The original version was released as a bonus track on the 1995 CD reissue of Who's Next.

"Behind Blue Eyes" was initially considered for a UK single release, but Townshend claimed that the song was "too much out of character" for the British singles market. However, the song did eventually see a single release in France, Belgium, the United States and the Netherlands. Backed with "My Wife" in the US and "Going Mobile" in Europe, the song reached #34 on the Billboard Hot 100 and #24 on Cashbox.  Cash Box called it "another Townshend masterpiece in traditional Who fashion."

Pete Townshend has also recorded two solo versions of the song. The original demo of the song was featured on the Scoop album. The demo along with a newer recording of the song featuring an orchestral backing was featured in The Lifehouse Chronicles.

Composition
The song starts with a solo voice singing over an arpeggiated acoustic guitar in the key of E minor, and a bass guitar and ethereal harmonies are added. Eventually, the song breaks out into a full-scale rock anthem, with a second theme being introduced near the end, before a brief reprise of the quieter first theme. Songs written in alternating sections were a feature of Townshend's writing of the period, going back at least to Tommy, where the technique was used in "Christmas" and "Go to the Mirror!" The guitar riff at the end of the rock anthem section is also used after the bridge during the song "Won't Get Fooled Again", perhaps serving as a link between the two songs when both were intended to be parts of a single rock opera.

Charts

Certifications

Personnel 

Roger Daltrey – lead vocals
Pete Townshend – acoustic and electric guitar, backing vocals
John Entwistle – bass, backing vocals
Keith Moon – drums

In other media

In the WB television series Buffy the Vampire Slayer, the episode "Where the Wild Things Are" (2000) features the character Rupert Giles (Anthony Stewart Head) singing a cover of the song.

A cover was used in the FX television series, Legion, in season 2, episode 11. The show's creator, Noah Hawley, sings the track with Jeff Russo on backing vocals as well as any instruments used in the song. However, in the context of the show, Dan Stevens and Navid Negahban sing the song in English and Persian.

Limp Bizkit version

"Behind Blue Eyes" was covered by American rap rock group Limp Bizkit. It was released in 2003 as a single from their album Results May Vary. Limp Bizkit's arrangement is notable for featuring a Speak & Spell during the bridge. This, together with a new verse and an extra chorus, replaces the rock theme of the Who's version. The song is followed by a hidden track titled "All That Easy", after a few seconds of silence, making the total length 5:58. However, the hidden track is not featured in the single release.

Although the cover received mainly negative reviews and reached only number 71 on the US Billboard Hot 100, it was more successful worldwide. It reached number one in the Czech Republic and Sweden and charted within the top three in Austria, Denmark, Germany, and Norway. Elsewhere in Europe, it became a top-twenty hit in Belgium, France, the Netherlands, and Switzerland while peaking at number 18 on the UK Singles Chart. In Australasia, it reached number four in Australia and number five in New Zealand.

Critical reception
The cover was panned by Rolling Stone magazine readers, who named it the second-worst cover song of all time. Conversely, Sun-Sentinel praised the cover (and "Build a Bridge"), saying that "Durst can do more than just rap."

Music video
The music video features Academy Award-winning actress Halle Berry. It contains scenes from the motion picture Gothika, in which Berry stars. It depicts Berry and Limp Bizkit's vocalist Fred Durst in a relationship similar to the storyline of the film. The song also appeared during the credits of the film itself and its music video was also featured as a bonus feature on the DVD release of the film.

Track listings
UK CD single
 "Behind Blue Eyes" (album version)
 "Just Drop Dead"
 "Rollin'" (DJ Monk vs. the Track Mack remix)
 "Behind Blue Eyes" (video)

European 7-inch single and German mini-CD single
 "Behind Blue Eyes" (album version) – 4:30
 "Just Drop Dead" – 4:02

Australasian CD single
 "Behind Blue Eyes" (album version)
 "Just Drop Dead"
 "My Way" (remixed by DJ Lethal)
 "Behind Blue Eyes" (video)

Charts

Weekly charts

Year-end charts

Decade-end charts

Certifications

Release history

References

1970s ballads
1971 singles
1971 songs
2003 singles
Decca Records singles
Flip Records (1994) singles
Jon English songs
Interscope Records singles
Limp Bizkit songs
MCA Records singles
Music videos directed by Fred Durst
Number-one singles in the Czech Republic
Number-one singles in Sweden
Polydor Records singles
Rock ballads
Song recordings produced by Glyn Johns
Song recordings produced by Pete Townshend
Song recordings produced by Rick Rubin
Songs about loneliness
Songs written by Pete Townshend
Track Records singles
The Who songs
Tokio Hotel songs
2021 singles